The 1929–30 Bradford City A.F.C. season was the 23rd in the club's history.

The club finished 18th in Division Two, and reached the 5th round of the FA Cup.

Sources

References

Bradford City A.F.C. seasons
Bradford City